John Frederick Halls Dally (2 August 1877 - 4 November 1944) was a British physician and president of the History of Medicine Society of the Royal Society of Medicine from 1941 to 1942 and in 1944.

Early life
John Frederick Halls Dally was born on 2 August 1877 at Wolverhampton and attended Wolverhampton School. He gained admission to St John's College, Cambridge and then went on to St Bartholomew's Hospital.

Medical career
He gained the Conjoint in 1901, MA MB MCH in 1903, MD in 1907 and MRCP in 1909.

He subsequently became physician to Mount Vernon Hospital when it was a chest hospital in Hampstead and was a senior physician to the St Marylebone and Western General Dispensary. In addition, he edited the journal of the West London Medico-Chirurgical Society, where he was also president.

Personal and family
He married Norah Willoughby Curtois and they lived at 93 Harley Street. They had one son, Edward.

He died at home on 4 November 1944.

Publications
High blood pressure, its variations and control : manual for practitioners, published by W. Heinemann, 1923.

References 

Presidents of the History of Medicine Society
1944 deaths
1877 births